The World Netball Rankings are published by the World Netball to make it possible to compare the relative strengths of internationally active national netball teams. Initially, rankings were based on the results from the World Netball Championships, and released after the conclusion of each event, every four years. A new ranking system was implemented on 11 February 2008, wherein teams are ranked based on international tests played, currently since July 2010. Teams appear on the rankings list once they have played eight international test matches, starting from July 2010.

Australia and New Zealand have dominated the INF world rankings in previous years and they are the only two netball nations to have ever held the number one world ranking since its introduction in 2009. More recently England have joined the duo, winning gold at the Commonwealth Games at Gold Coast, Australia in 2018.

The current country to hold the World Cup title is New Zealand.

Current world rankings

Notes and references 

Rankings
Sports world rankings